Diane Luby Lane is an American writer and nonprofit executive, best known as the founder and executive director of the nonprofit Get Lit-Words Ignite. Luby Lane's organization was a 2020 Library of Congress best practice nominee for “doing exemplary, innovative and replicable work that promotes literacy and responds to the needs of our time.” She is also the creator of the Get Lit in-school curriculum.

In 2012, Luby Lane created Get Lit's annual 3-day Classic Slam, a youth poetry slam which she co-produces.

Career 
Luby Lane founded the poetry organization Get Lit and remains its executive director.

She was executive producer on the feature film Our Words Collide, a documentary following the lives of five Get Lit poets in Los Angeles that premiered at the Santa Barbara International Film Festival in 2022, where it won the Anti-Defamation League (ADL) Award. She also co-produced the film Summertime, which was written by and starred 27 Get Lit poets and directed by Carlos López Estrada. Summertime opened the Sundance Film Festival in 2020 and was released to theaters in the US in the summer of 2021. In 2006 Lane wrote and starred in a one-woman show, Deep Sea Diving (AKA Born Feet First), which opened in Los Angeles and toured high schools, colleges, and detention centers with Chicano poet Jimmy Santiago Baca.

Awards and recognition 
Luby Lane's book Get Lit Rising (Simon & Schuster), is the winner of the 2016 Nautilus Award for young adult non-fiction.

She received the President's Volunteer Service Award from President Barack Obama.

Bibliography 
 Words of Women, Samuel French
 Get Lit Rising (with the Get Lit Players), Simon & Schuster, 2016

External links

References

Literacy advocates
Writers from Los Angeles
American women film producers
New York University alumni
University of South Florida alumni
People from Green Brook Township, New Jersey
American nonprofit chief executives
Year of birth missing (living people)
Living people